Eleanor Clark (1913 – 1996) was an American writer and "master stylist," best known for her non-fiction accounts.

Background

Eleanor Clark was born on July 6, 1913, in Los Angeles, California, but grew up in Roxbury, Connecticut. She attended Vassar College in the 1930s, where she met Mary McCarthy.

Career

Clark was involved with the literary magazine Con Spirito there, along with Elizabeth Bishop, Mary McCarthy, and her sister Eunice Clark.  She also associated with Herbert Solow and helped translate documents for the 1937 "trial" of Leon Trotsky.

During World War II, Clark worked in the Office of Strategic Services (OSS) in Washington, DC.

Clark wrote reviews, essays, children's books, and novels.

Personal life and death

In the late 1930s, Clark married Jan Frankel, a secretary of Trotsky; they divorced by the mid-1940s.  In 1952, Clark married Robert Penn Warren and lived in Fairfield, Connecticut, with him and their two children, Rosanna and Gabriel.

On February 16, 1996, Clark died age 82 in Boston, Massachusetts.

Awards

 1953: National Book Award finalist nonfiction for Rome and a Villa
 1964: National Book Award in Arts and Letter for The Oysters of Locmariaquer

Works

For her book The Oysters of Locmariaquer (1964), Clark received the U.S. National Book Award in category Arts and Letters.

At reissue of Rome and the Villa, Anatole Broyard called it "perhaps the finest book ever to be written about a city."

Clark wrote about her experiences with the CPUSA and Trotskyites in at least two fictionalized accounts, Bitter Box (1946) and Gloria Mundi (1979).

Novels:
 Bitter Box (1946)
 Baldur's Gate (1970) 
 Song of Roland (1960)
 Dr. Heart:  A Novella and Other Stories (1974)
 Gloria Mundi: A Novel (1979)

Nonfiction:
 Rome and a Villa (1952)
 Oysters of Locmariaquer (1964)
  Eyes, Etc.: A Memoir (1977)
 Tamrart: 13 Days in the Sahara (1984)
 Camping Out (1986)

Translations:
 Dark Wedding (1943), translation of Epitalamio del Prieto Trinidad by Ramón José Sender

See also

 Robert Penn Warren
 Rosanna Warren
 Mary McCarthy (author)
 Elizabeth Bishop
 Herbert Solow (journalist)

References

External links

Eleanor Clark Papers. Yale Collection of American Literature, Beinecke Rare Book and Manuscript Library.

1913 births
1996 deaths
20th-century American novelists
National Book Award winners
Vassar College alumni
Writers from Los Angeles
American women novelists
20th-century American women writers
American women non-fiction writers
20th-century American non-fiction writers
Members of the American Academy of Arts and Letters